The 1985–86 Southern Football League season was the 83rd in the history of the league, an English football competition.

Welling United won the Premier Division and earned promotion to the Football Conference, whilst RS Southampton and Oldbury United left the league at the end of the season.

Premier Division
The Premier Division consisted of 20 clubs, including 15 clubs from the previous season and five new clubs:
Two clubs promoted from the Midland Division:
Aylesbury United
Dudley Town

Two clubs promoted from the Southern Division:
Basingstoke Town
Gosport Borough

Plus:
Worcester City, relegated from the Alliance Premier League

The Premier Division was to be expanded in the next season so only two clubs were to be relegated this season, though after RS Southampton resigned from the league, only Gravesend & Northfleet was relegated.

League table

Midland Division
The Midland Division consisted of 21 clubs, including 16 clubs from the previous season and five new clubs:
Two clubs relegated from the Premier Division:
Gloucester City
Leamington

Plus:
Bilston Town, promoted from the West Midlands (Regional) League
Grantham, transferred from the Northern Premier League
Mile Oak Rovers, joined from the Midland Combination

League table

Southern Division
The Southern Division expanded up to 21 clubs, including 16 clubs from the previous season and five new clubs:
Corinthian
Hastings Town, new club replaced the folded Hastings United
Ruislip, promoted from the Middlesex County League
Trowbridge Town, relegated from the Premier Division

Also, at the end of the previous season Hillingdon merged with London Spartan League club Burnham to form a new club Burnham & Hillingdon, who took over a place in the Southern Football League.

League table

See also
Southern Football League
1985–86 Isthmian League
1985–86 Northern Premier League

References

Southern Football League seasons
6